Róbert Ragnar Spanó (born 27 August 1972) is an Icelandic jurist, Judge and former President of the European Court of Human Rights. He started his tenure on 18 May 2020, succeeding Judge Sicilianos from Greece. Before beginning his service on the Court on 1 November 2013, he served provisionally as Parliamentary Ombudsman of Iceland and Dean of the Faculty of Law, University of Iceland. Spano's mandate as a Judge and President of the Court ended on 31 October 2022 when he was succeeded by Judge Siofra O'Leary.

Early life and education 
Spano was born in Reykjavík on 27 August 1972. He graduated with a Candidatus Juris degree from the University of Iceland in 1997 and a Magister Juris degree with distinction in European and comparative law from the University of Oxford (University College) in 2000. At Oxford, he was awarded the Clifford Chance Prize (proxime accessit) and the Civil Procedure Prize for his scholastic achievements.

Professional career 
Spano began his legal career as a deputy judge at national level. He then became a legal adviser and special assistant to the Parliamentary Ombudsman, subsequently a tenured professor of law and Dean of the Faculty of Law, University of Iceland between 2010 and 2013. He was provisionally appointed Parliamentary Ombudsman in 2013 before being elected a judge to the European Court of Human Rights.

European Court of Human Rights 
In November 2013 he was elected a judge to the European Court of Human Rights, serving as its Vice President between 2019–2020 and its president between 2020 and 2022.

Visit to Turkey 
After Spano visited Turkey in September 2020 and received a honorary doctorate from the Istanbul University as the President of the European Court of Human Rights, he received criticism that the act would conflict with the court's stance and principles. Others came to Spano's defence, arguing that Spano had used the freedom of speech that his position guarantees to him, in a country that much suffers, to give courage to those who deserve to receive a free and fair message. Thus, the Court, through its President, had played its proper role for European liberties and democracy.

Mehmet Altan, a journalist and an academic discharged from Istanbul University by a Statutory Decree and released after 2 years of imprisonment, addressed an open letter to ECtHR President by stating “Those who will give you an honorary doctorate are the very people who dismissed me and many other academics”. Basak Demirtaş, the wife of imprisoned Selahattin Demirtaş against the orders of the ECHR, invited Spano to visit also Diyarbakır after he has already met with Justice and Development Party officials in Mardin. To Mardin he travelled together with the Turkish judge of the ECtHR, Saadet Yüksel and posed for photographs together with the state appointed trustee who acts as a mayor instead of the elected but deposed Ahmet Türk of the Peoples' Democratic Party (HDP). Mardin is also hometown ECtHR judge Yüksel, who is the sister of Cüneyt Yüksel, a former member of the parliament from Erdogan's ruling Justice and Development Party (AKP).

Visit to Slovenia 
In June 2021, Róbert Ragnar Spanó was invited by  Rajko Knez and Damijan Florjančič the presidents of the Constitutional Court and the Supreme Court to Slovenia. On the 24 June, he also met with president Borut Pahor.

Gibson, Dunn & Crutcher 
Spano's mandate as a Judge and President of the Court ended on 31 October 2022. Spano joined the leading US multinational law firm of Gibson, Dunn & Crutcher's London office on 1 January 2023 practicing in the field of international arbitration, digital rights, cyberspace, business and human rights (ESG, environment, social and governance) and governmental affairs and policy.

Writings 
Spano has written extrajudicially on the evolution of the Convention system, the principle of subsidiarity  and the rule of law, notably developing a theory on its "three-dimensional normative force" under the European Convention on Human Rights and Public International Law, the "organic dimension", the "functional dimension" and the "hybrid dimension". Furthermore, he is an acknowledged expert on international dispute resolution, business and human rights and in the field of digital rights and cyberspace.

Personal life 
Spano is married and has four children. Róbert is an avid singer and has won awards for his musical performances on stage. Spano was a promising amateur bowling player before he became a jurist. He won numerous competitions at home and internationally, both in individual and team tournaments. He is currently on a 9-year leave from the all-male choir Fóstbræður.

See also
List of judges of the European Court of Human Rights

References

External links
  Interview with Róbert R. Spanó at the University of Bergen

1972 births
Living people
Robert Ragnar Spano
Ombudsmen
Alumni of University College, Oxford
Presidents of the European Court of Human Rights
Robert Ragnar Spano
Robert Ragnar Spano
Icelandic people of Italian descent